The Hawaiian alphabet (in ) is an alphabet used to write Hawaiian. It was adapted from the English alphabet in the early 19th century by American missionaries to print a bible in the Hawaiian language.

Origins 
In 1778, British explorer James Cook made the first reported European voyage to Hawaii. In his report, he wrote the name of the islands as "Owhyhee" or "Owhyee". In 1822, a writing system based on one similar to the new New Zealand Grammar was developed and printed by American Protestant missionary Elisha Loomis. The original alphabet included five vowels and seven consonants:
 A, E, I, O, U, H, K, L, M, N, P, W, 

and seven diphthongs:
 AE, AI, AO, AU, EI, EU, OU

In addition, the letters F, G, S, Y, and Z were used to spell foreign words.

In 1826, the developers voted to eliminate some of the letters which represented functionally redundant interchangeable letters, enabling the Hawaiian alphabet to approach the ideal state of one-symbol-one-sound, and thereby optimizing the ease with which people could teach and learn the reading and writing of Hawaiian.
 Interchangeable B/P. B was dropped, P was kept
 Interchangeable L/R/D. L was kept, R and D were dropped
 Interchangeable K/T/D. K was kept, T and D were dropped
 Interchangeable V/W. V was dropped, W was kept

Okina
Due to words with different meanings being spelled alike, use of the glottal stop became desirable. As early as 1823, the missionaries made limited use of the apostrophe to represent the glottal stop, but they did not make it a letter of the alphabet. It was not until 1864 that the okina became a recognized letter of the Hawaiian alphabet.

Kahakō 
As early as 1821, one of the missionaries, Hiram Bingham, was using macrons in making handwritten transcriptions of Hawaiian vowels.

Modern alphabet 
The current official Hawaiian alphabet consists of 13 letters: five vowels (A a, E e, I i, O o, and U u) and eight consonants (H h, K k, L l, M m, N n, P p, W w, and ). Alphabetic order differs from the normal Latin order in that the vowels come first, then the consonants. The five vowels with macrons – Ā ā, Ē ē, Ī ī, Ō ō, Ū ū – are not treated as separate letters, but are alphabetized immediately after unaccented vowels. The okina is ignored for purposes of alphabetization, but is included as a consonant.

 Pronunciation 
The letter names were invented for Hawaiian specifically, since they do not follow traditional European letter names in most cases. The names of M, N, P, and possibly L were most likely derived from Greek, and that for W from the deleted letter V.
 Diphthongs

See also 
Hawaiian Braille

References 

Hawaiian language
Latin alphabets
1822 establishments in Hawaii